First sponsored in 1958, National Library Week (NLW) is a national observance sponsored by the American Library Association (ALA) and libraries across the United States each April, typically the second full week. It promotes library use and support.

In 1954, a nonprofit National Book Committee was established between the ALA and the American Book Publishers. In 1957, the committee developed the idea for National Library Week, hoping that it would motivate people to read and support libraries.

National Library Week occurs in April which is School Library Month. National Library Workers Day (Tuesday of the week), National Bookmobile Day, and Support Teen Literature Day (Thursday of the week) all occur during National Library Week. Each year the week has a new theme. The theme of the first sponsored week in 1954 was "Wake Up and Read!" and 2021's theme is "Welcome to Your Library."

The honorary chair of National Library Week, April 3–9, 2022 was actress, comedian Molly Shannon. The American Library Association released the State of America's Libraries Report, highlighting the challenges U.S. libraries faced in the second year of the pandemic.

Other countries
NLW has spread all to different countries. The first National Library Week of the Jamaica Library Association was held March 6–12, 1966.

Australia's Library and Information Week is organized by the Australian Library and Information Association, and held annually at the end of May. The first Australian Library Week was held in 1968 by the Australian Library Promotion Council.

The UK observes Libraries Week. Originally it was a one-day event, National Libraries Day, that began in 2012.

References

External links

Australian Library and Information Week from the Australian Library and Information Association
National Library Week from the American Library Association

American Library Association
Awareness weeks in the United States
April observances
March observances